Shmueli is a Jewish name and may refer to:

Doron Shmueli, Israeli politician
Galit Shmueli, Data scientist 
Shmueli Ungar, American religious singer
Zehava Shmueli, Israeli long distance runner